Nahr-e Jadid (also Romanized as Nahr-e Jadīd; also known as Ḩadbeh, Ḩazbeh, Jadīd) is a village in Abshar Rural District, in the Central District of Shadegan County, Khuzestan Province, Iran. At the 2006 census, its population was 1,124, in 204 families.

References 

Populated places in Shadegan County